"Fireball" is a song by American recording artist Willow. It was released on October 6, 2011.

Background and release
The song features rapper Nicki Minaj and was produced by the Stoopid Boots. The song premiered on October 4, 2011 on Hot 97's Angie Martinez Show. It was released on iTunes two days later and was released to U.S. urban radio on October 18, 2011. In the song, Minaj says: "Ok, I'm the street fighter, call me Chun-Li" making a reference to the character Chun-Li from the video game franchise Street Fighter and for who she ironically released a song of the same name as the character in 2018.

Live performances
Willow performed the song on the U.S. edition of The X-Factor on November 10, 2011.

Music video
The music video for the song was released on December 9, 2011 and features Smith singing the song around the city streets constantly stating that she is the "Fireball" of the party and she is eventually joined by Minaj.

Charts

Awards and nominations
The song was nominated for the BTM Award (Best Teen Music) at the MP3 Music Awards in 2012.

References

 

2011 singles
2011 songs
Nicki Minaj songs
Roc Nation singles
Songs written by Marc Kinchen
Songs written by Nicki Minaj
Willow Smith songs
Songs written by Willow Smith